Ch. Haymarket Faultless was a male Bull Terrier who won best in show at the 1918 Westminster Kennel Club Dog Show. He was bred and owned by R.H. Elliot. Haymarket Fautless narrowly beat out a Pekingese, Phantom of Ashcroft. The show was so close that the referee had to be called in to decide the winner.

References

Best in Show winners of the Westminster Kennel Club Dog Show